Ardozyga hypoleuca is a species of moth in the family Gelechiidae. It was described by Edward Meyrick in 1904. It is found in Australia, where it has been recorded from New South Wales.

The forewings are light grey, mixed with whitish and sprinkled with dark fuscous. The stigmata are large, formed of dark fuscous irroration, with the plical obliquely beyond the first discal. The dark fuscous irroration tends to form similar spots on the fold before and beyond the plical, between the discal stigmata, and along the posterior half of the costa and termen. The hindwings are whitish.

References

Ardozyga
Moths described in 1904
Taxa named by Edward Meyrick
Moths of Australia